The Burckle crater is an undersea feature about  in diameter, in the southwestern Indian Ocean. 

The Russian Academy of Sciences lists the feature as a potential impact crater.
The Holocene Impact Working Group (HIWG) propose that it was formed by a very large-scale and relatively recent (c. 3000–2800 BCE) meteorite impact event, possibly resulting from a comet.

Description 
The feature is located east of Madagascar and west of Western Australia in the southern Indian ocean, adjacent to the SW Indian Ocean Ridge. Its position was determined in 2006 by the Holocene Impact Working Group using prehistoric chevron dune formations in Australia and Madagascar. Based on the hypothesis these dunes were formed by a megatsunami resulting from an impact, the researchers were able to triangulate the location of Burckle crater. The hypothesis that these chevron dunes were caused by a megatsunami has been challenged by geologists Jody Bourgeois and R. Weiss in 2009. Using a computer model to simulate a tsunami, they argue that the structures are more consistent with aeolian processes. The tsunami origin of these chevrons is also disputed by other Earth scientists.

Formation 
Burckle crater has not yet been dated by radiometric analysis of its sediments. The Holocene Impact Working Group researchers think that it formed about 5,000 years ago (c. 3000–2800 BCE), during the Holocene epoch. They consider the possibility that a comet, or the remains of one, hit the ocean floor, with subsequent megatsunamis creating the dune formations which allowed the crater to be pin-pointed.

Unusual calcite (CaCO3) crystals, translucent carbon spherules, fragments of basaltic glass and native metals (native iron and nickel) are reported near the crater and associated with impact ejecta or hot water precipitates. Seawater at the depth of the crater is undersaturated with respect to calcite and rapid burial would have been needed to preserve those crystals.

See also 

 Fenambosy Chevron
 Flood myth
 List of possible impact structures on Earth
 Mahuika crater
 Umm al Binni structure

References

Bibliography

External links 
 Anonymous (2009) Past Tsunamis? Contrary To Recent Hypothesis, 'Chevrons' Are Not Evidence Of Megatsunamis. ScienceDaily, April 30, 2009.
 Colvin, M. (2006) ''Researchers claim link between tsunamis and outer space." ABC News, Australia (Transcript of ABC interview with Ted Bryant) November 14, 2006.

Possible impact craters on Earth
Holocene impact craters
Geography of the Indian Ocean